Roger Pearson is a professor of French at the University of Oxford and a fellow of The Queen's College, Oxford. His research focuses on eighteenth and nineteenth century French literature and has worked particularly on Voltaire, Stendhal, Émile Zola, Guy de Maupassant and Stéphane Mallarmé. Pearson has also worked as a French to English translator.

Pearson did his undergraduate and postgraduate studies at Exeter College, Oxford. He then became a College Lecturer at The Queen's College in October 1973. In 1977 he became a full University Lecturer and was appointed professor in 1997. In 2005 he was appointed Officer in the Ordre des Palmes Académiques by the French government.

Pearson's book Mallarmé and Circumstance: The Translation of Silence was awarded the 2005 R. H. Gapper Book Prize by the UK Society for French Studies. This prize recognises the work as the best book published by a scholar working in Britain or Ireland in French studies in 2004.

Publications
Authored Books
 Stendhal's Violin: A Novelist and his Reader (Oxford: Clarendon Press, 1988)
 The Fables of Reason: A Study of Voltaire's 'contes philosophiques (Oxford: Clarendon Press, 1993)
 Unfolding Mallarmé: The Development of a Poetic Art (Oxford: Clarendon Press, 1996)
 Mallarmé and Circumstance: The Translation of Silence (Oxford: Clarendon Press, 2004)
 Voltaire Almighty: A Life in Pursuit of Freedom  (London: Bloomsbury, 2005)Translations'''
 Zola, La Bete humaine, Oxford World's Classics (Oxford University Press, 1996)
 Zola, Germinal, Penguin Classics (London: Penguin, 2004)
 Voltaire, Candide and Other Stories'', Oxford World's Classics (Oxford University Press, 2006)

External links
 Pearson's Page at the University of Oxford
 Pearson's page at the Queen's College, Oxford

Notes and references

Alumni of Exeter College, Oxford
Fellows of The Queen's College, Oxford
Academics of the University of Oxford
English literary critics
Literary critics of French
Translators of Émile Zola
Officiers of the Ordre des Palmes Académiques
French–English translators
British translators
Year of birth missing (living people)
Living people